Texas Renegades may refer to:

 Texas Renegades (film), 1940 film
 Texas Renegades (ice hockey), American ice hockey team